is a university on the slopes of Mount Rokkō in Higashinada-ku, Kobe, Japan. A private university with approximately 10,000 students, it offers a wide variety of programs to Japanese students, as well as an international exchange program through the Konan International Exchange Center.

History
Konan University was founded in 1951. The university traces its origin to 1919 when Konan Gaku-en Middle School was founded in Okamoto, Kobe, Japan. The formation of the school is based on the ideals of character building (personality development), physical fitness, and respect for the individual. Konan University offers undergraduate and graduate programs (Master's and Ph.D.). All programs are accredited by Japan's Ministry of Education, Culture, Sports, Science and Technology.

Campus
Konan University has three campuses in Hyogo prefecture, Japan: Okamoto Campus (the main campus), Nishinomiya Campus (Hirao School of Management), and the Port Island Campus (Science, Medicine & Engineering Research). Okamoto Campus is on the eastern edge of Kobe City in Okamoto, a renowned residential area between Osaka and Kobe.

Undergraduate education
Seven faculties and one school provide undergraduate education. 
 Faculty of Letters (similar to a Faculty of Arts and Social Sciences in North American universities)
 Faculty of Science and Engineering
 Faculty of Economics
 Faculty of Law
 Faculty of Business Administration
 Faculty of Intelligence and Informatics 
 Faculty of Frontiers of Innovative Research in Science and Technology 
 Hirao School of Management

Graduate education
Graduate education is provided by five schools. 
 Graduate School of Humanities (Japanese Literature and Language, Applied Sociology, Human Sciences)
 Graduate School of Natural Science (Physics, Chemistry, Biology, Information Science and Systems Engineering) 
 Graduate School of Social Science (Economics, Management)
 Graduate School of Law 
 Graduate School of Accounting

Academic rankings

Overall rankings 
 QS University Rankings: Asia 2013: not included
 Webometrics Ranking of World Universities 2014: (World Rank) 2,574; (Country Rank) 134
 Webometrics Ranking of World Universities, July 2012: (World Rank) 2,553
 Top organizations: Rankings on SSRN (Social Science Research Network): 
 Ranked by total new downloads (last updated on 08/01/2014)
Konan University - Graduate School of Business and Accounting
885th among the SSRN Top 1,000 Business Schools
570 th among the SSRN Top 1,000 International (Non-U.S.) Business Schools
5th among Business Schools in Japan (①Kobe U., ②Keio U., ③Hitotsubashi U., ④Hosei U., ⑤Konan U.)

International students
Konan offers a program for international students through the Konan International Exchange Center or KIEC. This program runs from September through May for students from North America and Europe, and from January to December for students from Australia and New Zealand. The program, which is usually made up of between 30 and 45 students, includes rigorous language study, Japanese studies classes on topics of Japanese culture, business, and society, and a homestay in which the student lives with a Japanese family. In previous years the homestay was a mandatory part of the program, however, due to increasing numbers of international students in the academic year 2008–2009, a dormitory option was made available for non-Illinois Consortium for International Studies and Programs students.

Konan offers exchange opportunities with the following universities:
 Australia
 Murdoch University
 Edith Cowan University
 Canada
 Carleton University
 University of Victoria
 China
 Northwest University
 Beijing University of Posts and Telecommunications
 France
 François Rabelais University, Tours
 Jean Moulin University Lyon 3
 Germany
 Humboldt-Universität zu Berlin
 Cologne Business School, Köln
 Korea
 Hanyang University
 New Zealand
 University of Waikato
Taiwan
 National Taipei University
 Tunghai University
 United Kingdom
 Leeds University
 United States of America
 University of Illinois at Urbana–Champaign
 University at Buffalo, The State University of New York

In addition, students from the Illinois Consortium are welcome. This includes the University of Hawaii, the University of Arizona, and the University of Pittsburgh.

Notable faculty
Ueno, Susumu: representative director of the Asia-Pacific Management Accounting Association (APMAA); chief editor of Asia Pacific Management Accounting Journal (APMAJ); the 2014 Japanese Association of Management Accounting Special Award Recipient.

Notable alumni 

 Hiro Matsushita - Businessman, former driver in Champ Car series, Chairman of Swift Engineering & Swift Xi
 Reiko Okutani - Businesswoman
 Tomoki Yokoyama - Professional shogi player
 Mai Mihara - Figure skater

See also

 Lycée Konan: Japanese boarding school in France operated from 1991 to 2013 under the Konan Foundation

References

External links
 Konan University
 Konan University 

 
Buildings and structures in Kobe
Education in Kobe
Kansai Collegiate American Football League
Private universities and colleges in Japan